Boštjan Žitnik (born 31 March 1971 in Ljubljana) is a Yugoslav-born, Slovenian slalom canoeist who competed at the international level from 1986 to 1995.

He won two medals in the C1 team event at the ICF Canoe Slalom World Championships with a gold in 1993 (for Slovenia) and a bronze in 1989 (for Yugoslavia).

Žitnik also finished tenth in the C1 event at the 1992 Summer Olympics in Barcelona.

His father Franc represented Yugoslavia at the 1972 Summer Olympics where he finished 19th in the C2 event.

World Cup individual podiums

References

ICF medalists for Olympic and World Championships - Part 2: rest of flatwater (now sprint) and remaining canoeing disciplines: 1936-2007.

1971 births
Canoeists at the 1992 Summer Olympics
Living people
Olympic canoeists of Slovenia
Slovenian male canoeists
Yugoslav male canoeists
Sportspeople from Ljubljana
Medalists at the ICF Canoe Slalom World Championships